This is a list of the vice-admirals of Ulster, a province in the north of Ireland.

Prior to 1585 the whole of Ireland was served by a single vice-admiral, namely Thomas Radcliffe, 3rd Earl of Sussex (1558–1565), Gerald Fitzgerald, 11th Earl of Kildare (1564–1573) and Thomas Butler, 10th Earl of Ormonde (1585). Separate vice-admiralties were then established for Munster in 1585, for Ulster by 1602, for Leinster by 1612 and for Connaught by 1615.

Vice-admirals of Ulster
Source (1602–61):

Source (1661–:

Ulster
 1585–1602 no appointment known
 1602–1625 Sir Arthur Chichester
 1625–1639 Sir Edward Chichester
 1639–? no appointment known 
 ?–1647 Sir William Stewart, 1st Baronet
 1647–1660 no appointment known
 1661 John Davis
 1666 Gorges
 1691–1709 Gustavus Hamilton
 1710–1715 Frederick Hamilton
 1716–1723 Gustavus Hamilton
 1748–1779 Henry Conyngham, 1st Earl Conyngham
 1779–1796 William Burton (Conyngham)
 1822–1841 Charles O'Neill, 1st Earl O'Neill
 1841–1849 Archibald Acheson, 2nd Earl of Gosford
 1849–1876 Francis Nathaniel Conyngham, 2nd Marquess Conyngham
 George Conyngham, 3rd Marquess Conyngham (died 1882)
 Archibald Acheson, 4th Earl of Gosford (died 1922)

Northern Ireland
 1923 Frederick Hamilton-Temple-Blackwood, 3rd Marquess of Dufferin and Ava (died 1930)
 1937–1961 Francis Needham, 4th Earl of Kilmorey 
 1961–1973 Basil Brooke, 1st Viscount Brookeborough

References

Military ranks of the United Kingdom
Vice-Admirals
Ulster